Cairngorm is a  mountain located in Alberta, Canada.

Description
Cairngorm is set within Jasper National Park, in the Victoria Cross Ranges of the Canadian Rockies. The peak is composed of sedimentary rock laid down from the Precambrian to the Jurassic periods which was pushed east and over the top of younger rock during the Laramide orogeny. Precipitation runoff from Cairngorm drains into tributaries of the Miette, Snaring and Athabasca rivers. Topographic relief is modest as the summit rises 1,430 meters (4,690 feet) above Pyramid Lake in six kilometers (3.7 miles).

History
The mountain was named in 1916 by Morrison P. Bridgland after the Cairngorms, a mountain range in the Scottish Highlands associated with the mountain Cairn Gorm. Bridgland (1878–1948), was a Dominion Land Surveyor who named many peaks in Jasper Park and the Canadian Rockies. The mountain's toponym was officially adopted February 7, 1951, by the Geographical Names Board of Canada.

Climate
Based on the Köppen climate classification, Cairngorm is located in a subarctic climate zone with cold, snowy winters, and mild summers. Winter temperatures can drop below  with wind chill factors below .

See also
 
 Geography of Alberta

Gallery

References

External links
 Cairngorm: weather forecast
 Parks Canada web site: Jasper National Park

Two-thousanders of Alberta
Mountains of Jasper National Park
Canadian Rockies
Alberta's Rockies